Shane Smith (born September 24, 1985) is a retired American soccer player.

Career
Shane Smith played college soccer at University of Mobile, and also played with Houston-based indoor team Alamo City Warriors in the Professional Arena Soccer League, and in the USL Premier Development League with Houston Leones. He turned professional in 2011 when he signed with the Dayton Dutch Lions of the USL Pro league on April 16, 2011.

Smith made his professional debut on April 16, 2011, in the Lions' season-opening game against the Charleston Battery. Smith re-signed with Dayton in January 2012.

Smith now coaches youth development teams with CUSA Crew SC an affiliate of Columbus Crew SC.

References

1985 births
Living people
American soccer players
Dayton Dutch Lions players
Houston Leones players
USL League Two players
USL Championship players
Place of birth missing (living people)
University of Mobile alumni
Association football defenders